Super Manège was a steel roller coaster at La Ronde in Montreal, Canada. It was built in 1981 by Vekoma as the park's first inverting roller-coaster.  The ride ended operation on August 25, 2019 and was slated be replaced with an Intamin Zac Spin coaster, called "Vipère".  This plan was scrapped in 2022, when the park announced the cancellation of Vipère's installation.  The life of Super Manège ended abruptly just a few hours before its scheduled closing, when a rider's restraint failed in the first climbing stage. The ride closed for the remainder of the day for inspection, never to reopen, and was soon demolished.

Ride
The ride started by climbing to a height of 75 feet. After a small drop and a curve, riders were taken down a steep 68-foot-tall drop and a smaller hill. They then experienced two corkscrew inversions, the main highlight of the ride. The coaster then went into several high-speed turns and helices, followed by a long brake run and a curve into the station. Most riders experienced pain due to the shape of the restraints and the corkscrew inversions.

Location
The closed ride was located between Le Monstre a wooden roller-coaster, Le Boomerang, and close to the Manitou. The Splash ride's entrance was across the pathway from the entrance of Le Super Manege.

Etymology
Literally translated, "Le Super Manège" means "The Super Ride". This reflected its significance in introducing inverting rides to the park. The ride originally opened as "Corkscrew".

References

External links
 Roller Coaster Database
 Le Super Manège's page on La Ronde's website

La Ronde (amusement park)
Roller coasters in Quebec
Roller coasters introduced in 1981
Roller coasters operated by Six Flags
Roller coasters manufactured by Vekoma